ND Studios is a film and television production studio located in Karjat, Maharashtra a north suburb of Mumbai. Established in 2005, it is owned by Nitin Chandrakant Desai . Apart from films, it is also the location reality TV series, Bigg Boss hosted by Salman Khan.

Over the years, it has also become a popular tourist destination, as it is a 90-minute drive from Mumbai, Maharashtra.

History

The Studio is spread over 52 acres (210,000 m2) and was opened in 2005 and offers indoor as well as outdoor shooting options. The Studio is privately owned by production designer Nitin Chandrakant Desai .

In 2008, US-based movie studio 20th Century Fox signed a 10-year deal to hire four floors at ND Studios.

Location used for 
Films
 Kick (Film)
 Jodhaa Akbar (film)
 Jodha Akbar (TV Series)
 Bigg Boss (Reality Show)
 Raja Shivchhatrapati (Marathi)(TV Series)
 Balgandharva (Marathi)(Movie) 
 Marathi Paul Padte Pudhe (Marathi) (Talent Show)
 Amol Gupte's "Sapno Ko Ginte Ginte"
 Slumdog Millionaire (2008)
 Chittod Ki Rani Padmini Ka Johur (2009) (TV Series)
 Taj Mahal (TV Series)
 Bajirao Mastani (Film)
 Prem Ratan Dhan Payo (2015)
 Pyaar Kii Yeh Ek Kahaani
 Chakravartin Ashoka Samrat

Music videos
 "Lean On" by Major Lazer

Photo gallery

References

External links
 

Hindi cinema
Film studios in Mumbai
Television studios
Companies based in Maharashtra
Raigad district
Reliance Group
Entertainment companies established in 2005
2005 establishments in Maharashtra